Irene Sunters (29 February 1928 – September 2005) was a Scottish actress who was best known for playing Maggie Ferguson the bus driver in Take the High Road from the first episode in 1980 and appeared as a regular character until 1982 with guest appearances until 1990. She also played the role of May Morrison, mother of Rowan Morrison in the cult horror film The Wicker Man in 1973, and Mary's mother in Rab C Nesbitt.

Irene Sunters died in September 2005 after some years of poor health and inactivity.

Filmography
1956: The Anatomist (TV movie) starring Irene Sunters (as Jessie Ann) was released on 6 February 1956.

1961: Three Ring Circus (TV movie) starring Irene Sunters was released on 2 February 1961.

1973: The Wicker Man (movie) She played the mother(May) of Rowan Morrison in this cult horror film

1988: The Steamie (TV movie) with Irene Sunters as Grumpy Woman was released on 30 December 1988.

References

External links 
 

1928 births
2005 deaths
Scottish television actresses